Şaziye is a Turkish female given name. People named Şaziye include:

Şaziye Erdoğan (born 1992), Turkish female weightlifter 
Şaziye İvegin, Turkish female basketball player
Şaziye Moral (1903–1985), Turkish stage, film and voice actress

See also
 Şaziye, Düzce

 Shazia

Turkish feminine given names